The Lac Sainte-Anne (English: Sainte-Anne Lake) is a freshwater body at the head of the Sainte-Anne River in the unorganized territory of Lac-Croche, in the La Jacques-Cartier Regional County Municipality, in the administrative region of Capitale-Nationale, in the province from Quebec, to Canada. This body of water is located in the Laurentides Wildlife Reserve.

The area around the lake is served by the forest road R0300 which runs on the east side of the lake, and by another forest road from the south which connects to the first, south of the lake. These roads serve this area for the purposes of forestry and recreational tourism activities.

Forestry is the main economic activity in the sector; recreational tourism, second.

The surface of Lake Sainte-Anne is usually frozen from the beginning of December to the end of March, however the safe circulation on the ice is generally made from mid-December to mid-March.

Geography 
This lake deep in the mountains is long and has three small islands.

Lake Sainte-Anne supplies water through landfills:
 north side: the outlet of the lakes of Émilie, Sioui, de la Spartine, Beauclair and Petit lac Beauclair lakes;
 east side: the outlet of an unidentified lake;
 southwest side: the outlet of lakes Louise, Trépanier, Cuvette, La Saulx and Bastonis.

From the mouth of Lac Sainte-Anne, the current descends on  following the course of the Sainte-Anne River (Mauricie) to the northeast shore of St. Lawrence River.

Toponymy
The toponym Lac Sainte-Anne was formalized on December 5, 1968, by the Commission de toponymie du Québec.

See also 
 La Jacques-Cartier Regional County Municipality
 Lac-Croche, an unorganized territory
 Sainte-Anne River (Mauricie)
 St. Lawrence River
 List of lakes of Canada

References 

Lakes of Capitale-Nationale
La Jacques-Cartier Regional County Municipality
Laurentides Wildlife Reserve